Akhni is a mixed rice dish with its origins among the  Bengali Muslims of Chittagong and Sylhet, in eastern Bangladesh. It is often considered to be a particular variation of biryani or polao. The dish is especially popular in restaurants throughout Bangladesh, as well as among the diaspora across the world. The dish is a staple in Chittagong, where it is said to be consumed every week by the average Chittagonian person. During Ramadan, the Islamic month of fasting, the dish is popularly eaten at Iftar meals across Sylhet too.

Etymology
The word 'akhni' is derived from the Arabic term, yakhni, which means stew.

Ingredients
It is made by mixing rice with cooking oil, traditional spices (ginger, garlic, garam masala, tejpata, cumin, onion, salt), ghee, meat (chicken, beef, goat, lamb), fruits and vegetables (carrots, potatoes, peas, plums), chili pepper and sour doi. Occasionally, nuts and eggs may also be added.

See also
List of rice dishes

References

Bangladeshi rice dishes
Bengali cuisine
Desi culture
Iftar foods